The following is a list persons who have held the chairs of the Muséum national d'histoire naturelle. The number of chaired positions, and their subject areas, have evolved since the creation of the original twelve chairs, some being subdivided into two positions and others removed. (Titles translated)

 Animal Anatomy
 1793 to 1802: Jean-Claude Mertrud
 1802 to 1832: Georges Cuvier. This chair was renamed Comparative Anatomy.
Comparative Anatomy
 1832 to 1850: Henri Marie Ducrotay de Blainville
 1850 to 1855: Georges Louis Duvernoy
 1855 to 1868: Etienne Serres
 1868 to 1879: Paul Gervais
 1879 to 1894: Georges Pouchet
 1894 to 1902: Henri Filhol
 1903 to 1921: Edmond Perrier
 1922 to 1941: Raoul Anthony
 1942: Empty
 1943 to 1960: Jacques Millot
 1961: Empty
 1962 to 1984: Jean Anthony
 1984 to 2001: Empty
Human Anatomy
 1793 to 1832: Antoine Portal
 1832 to 1838: Pierre Flourens. This chair was renamed Anatomy and Natural History of Man.
 Anatomy and Natural History of Man
 1839 to 1855: Etienne Serres. This chair was renamed Anthropology.
 Anthropology
 1855 to 1892: Jean Louis Armand de Quatrefages de Bréau
 1892 to 1908: Ernest Hamy
 1909 to 1927: René Verneau 
 1928 to 1936: Paul Rivet. This chair was renamed Ethnology of Modern Man and Fossilized Man when the Musée de l'Homme was created.
 Ethnology of Modern Man and Fossilized Man
 1937 to 1940: Paul Rivet
 1941 to 1944: Henri Vallois
 1945 to 1949: Paul Rivet
 1950 to 1959: Henri Vallois
 1960 to 1967: Henri Vallois. This chair was renamed Anthropology and Ethnology.
 Anthropology and ethnology
 1968 to 1970: Robert Gessain. This chair was renamed Anthropology.
 Anthropology
 1970 to 1979: Robert Gessain
 1980 to 1983: Yves Coppens
 1983 to 1985: unknown
 Comparative Physiology
 1837-1838: Frédéric Cuvier
 1838-1867: Pierre Flourens. This chair was exchanged with the chair of General Physiology by the faculty of Sciences in Paris. 
 1868-1879: Claude Bernard
Chemistry
 1779 to 1793: Antoine-Louis Brongniart
 1804 to 1830: Louis-Nicolas Vauquelin
 1830 to 1850: Michel Eugène Chevreul. This chair was renamed Chemistry as Applied to Organic Compounds (Organic Chemistry).
 Chemistry as Applied to Organic Compounds
 1850 to 1889: Michel Eugène Chevreul
 1890 to 1915: Léon-Albert Arnaud
 1915 to 1919: unknown
 1919 to 1925: Louis-Jacques Simon
 1926 to 1927: unknown
 1928 to 1936: Richard Fosse. This chair joined with the chair of botany to become the chair of Organic and Physical Chemistry of Plants. 
 Organic and Physical Chemistry of Plants
 1936 to 1940: Richard Fosse
 1941: unknown. This chair was renamed Chemistry as Applied to Organic Compounds.
 Chemistry as Applied to Organic Compounds
 1941 to 1957: Charles Sannié
 1958 to 1967: Charles Mentzer
 1968: unknown
 1969 to 1989: Darius Molho
 1989 to 2001: not assigned

General Chemistry
 1793 to 1809: Antoine-François Fourcroy
 1809 to 1811: unknown
 1811 to 1832: André Laugier
 1832 to 1850: Joseph-Louis Gay-Lussac. This chair was renamed Chemistry as Applied to Inorganic Compounds.
 Chemistry as Applied to Inorganic Compounds
 1850 to 1892: Edmond Frémy. This chair was removed.
Plants in the Countryside (literal translation)
 1793 to 1826: Antoine-Laurent de Jussieu
 1826 to 1853: Adrien-Henri de Jussieu. This chair was removed and replaced by the chair of paleontology.
Botany in the Museum
 1793 to 1833: René Desfontaines
 1833 to 1857: Adolphe Brongniart. This chair was renamed Botany and Plant Physiology.
 Botany and Plant Physiology
 1857 to 1874: Adolphe Brongniart. This chair was renamed Botany, Organology and Plant Physiology.
 Botany, Organology and Plant Physiology
 1874 to 1876: Adolphe Brongniart
 1876 to 1879: unknown
 1879 to 1914: Philippe Van Tieghem
 1914 to 1918: unknown
 1919 to 1932: Julien Noël Costantin
 1933: unknown. This chair was renamed Comparative Anatomy of Current Plants and Fossils and was removed in 1934. It was restored in 1937.
 Comparative Anatomy of Current Plants and Fossils
 1938 to 1944: Paul Bertrand
 1945 to 1958: Auguste Loubière. This chair was changed to Plant Physics.
 Plant Physics
 1857 to 1897: Georges Ville
 1898 to 1925: Léon Maquenne
 1926 to 1931: Marc Bridel
 1931 to 1934: unknown. This chair was removed in 1935. It was restored in 1959.
 1959 to 1960: Pierre Donzelot
 1961 to 1962: Charles Sadron. This chair was renamed Biophysics.
 Biophysics
 1962 to 1975: Charles Sadron
 1976 to 2001: Claude Hélène
 Botany (Classification and Natural Families)
 1874 to 1905: Édouard Bureau. After the creation of the chair of Botany (Classification and Natural Families of Cryptogams), this chair was reduced to the Phanerogams (Spermatophytes).
 Botany (Classification and Natural Families of Phanerogams
 1906 to 1931: Henri Lecomte
 1931 to 1933: Jean-Henri Humbert. This chair was renamed Phanerogamy.
 Phanerogamy
 1933 to 1957: Jean-Henri Humbert
 1958 to 1968: André Aubréville
 1969 to 1985: Jean-François Leroy.
 1986 to 2001: Philippe Morat
 Botany (Classification and Natural Families of Cryptogams
 1905 to 1931: Louis Mangin
 1932 to 1932: Pierre Allorge. This chair was renamed Cryptogamy.
 Cryptogamy
 1933 to 1944: Pierre Allorge
 1945 to 1973: Roger Heim
 1974: unknown
 1975 to 1982: Suzanne Jovet-Ast
 1983 to 2001: not assigned
 Horticulture (Agriculture and Culture of Gardens, Vineyards and Orchards)
 1793 to 1824: André Thouin
 1825 to 1828: Louis-Augustin Bosc d’Antic
 1828 to 1850: Charles-François Brisseau de Mirbel
 1850 to 1882: Joseph Decaisne
 1883: unknown
 1884 to 1901: Maxime Cornu
 1901 to 1919: Julien Costantin
 1920 to 1932: Désiré Bois
 1932 to 1956: André Guillaumin
 1956 to 1956: unknown. This chair was renamed Applied Plant Biology.
 Applied Plant Biology
 1961 to 1985: Jean-Louis Hamel
 Ecology and the Protection of Nature
 1955 to 1958: Georges Kuhnholtz-Lordat. This chair was renamed General Ecology.
 General Ecology.
 1960 to 1962: Paul Rémy
 1963 to 1983: Claude Delamare-Deboutteville. In 1983 this chair was transformed into the Service for the Conservation of Nature whose first person in charge was François Terrasson.

Zoology (Quadrupeds, Cetacea, Birds, Reptiles, Fish)
 1793 to 1794: Étienne Geoffroy Saint-Hilaire. This chair was subdivided into two chairs:
Zoology (Mammals and Birds)
 1794 to 1841: Étienne Geoffroy Saint-Hilaire
 1841 to 1861: Isidore Geoffroy Saint-Hilaire
 1862 to 1876: Henri Milne Edwards
 1876 to 1900: Alphonse Milne-Edwards
 1900 to 1906: Émile Oustalet
 1906 to 1926: Édouard Trouessart
 1926 to 1947: Édouard Bourdelle
 1948: unknown
 1949 to 1962: Jacques Berlioz
 1963: not assigned
 1964 to 1985: Jean Dorst
 1985 to 2001: not assigned
Zoology (Reptiles and Fish)
 1795 to 1825: Bernard Germain Étienne de Laville-sur-Illon, comte de Lacépède. (N.b. 1825 is the year of Lacépède's death, but actually Duméril replaced him in the chair of zoology as early as 1803 because Lacépède, who was occupied with his political appointments, relinquished his professorship.
 1825 to 1857: André Marie Constant Duméril
 1857 to 1870: Auguste Duméril
 1870 to 1875: Émile Blanchard (who held the chair during a period of transition) 
 1875 to 1909: Léon Vaillant
 1910 to 1937: Louis Roule
 1937 to 1943: Jacques Pellegrin
 1944 to 1956: Léon Bertin
 1957 to 1975: Jean Guibé. This chair was subdivided: The fish were transferred to the chair of Dynamics of Aquatic Populations and became the chair of General and Applied Ichthyology. This chair was then renamed Zoology (Reptiles and Amphibians).
 Zoology (Reptiles and Amphibians)
 1977 to 1998: Édouard-Raoul Brygoo
 1998 to 2001: not assigned
 Dynamics of Aquatic Populations
 1975: Jacques Daget. This chair was renamed General and Applied Ichthyology.
 General and Applied Ichthyology
 1976 to 1984: Jacques Daget
 1985 to 2001: Marie-Louise Bauchot (de facto in office although not officially recognised)

Zoology (Insects, Worms and Microscopic Animals)  
 1793 to 1829: Jean-Baptist de Lamarck. With his death, this chair was subdivided into two chairs: 
 Natural History of Shellfish, Arachnids and the Insects or Articulated Animals
 1830 to 1833: Pierre André Latreille
 1833 to 1841: Victor Audouin
 1841 to 1862: Henri Milne Edwards
 1864 to 1894: Émile Blanchard
 1895 to 1917: Eugène Louis Bouvier. This chair is then restricted to only insects and is renamed Entomology.
 Entomology
 1917 to 1931: Eugène Louis Bouvier
 1931 to 1950: René Jeannel
 1951 to 1955: Lucien Chopard
 1956 to 1960: Eugène Séguy
 1961: unknown
 1962 to 1963: Alfred Balachowsky. This chair is renamed General and Applied Entomology.
 General and Applied Entomology
 1963 to 1974: Alfred Balachowsky
 1975 to 1987: Jacques Carayon
 1987 to 2000: Claude Caussanel
 2000 to 2001: Loïc Matile
 Natural History of Mollusks, Worms and Zoophytes
 1830 to 1832: Henri Marie Ducrotay de Blainville
 1832 to 1865: Achille Valenciennes
 1865 to 1869: Henri de Lacaze-Duthiers
 1869 to 1875: Gérard Paul Deshayes
 1876 to 1903: Edmond Perrier
 1903 to 1917: Louis Joubin. This chair is then restricted to mollusks and zoophytes is renamed Malacology.
 Malacology
 1917 to 1935: Louis Joubin
 1935 to 1942: Louis Germain
 1943 to 1970: Édouard Fischer-Piette. This chair is then attached to that of Biology of Marine Invertebrates.
 Biology of Marine Invertebrates
 1966 to 2001: Claude Lévi
 Zoology (Worms and Crustaceans)
 1917 to 1937: Charles Gravier
 1938 to 1954: Louis Fage
 1955 to 1955: Max Vachon. The worms were separated from the arthropods. The chair of Zoology (Arthropods) was then created.
 Zoology (Worms)
 1960 to 1990: Alain Chabaud
 Zoology (Arthropods)
 1960 to 1978: Max Vachon
 1979 to 2001: Yves Coineau
 Entomology of Colonial Agriculture
 1942 to 1958 Paul Vayssière. This chair was then renamed Entomology of Tropical Agriculture.
 Entomology of Tropical Agriculture
 1958 to 1960 Paul Vayssière. This chair was then removed.
Mineralogy
 1793 to 1800: Louis Jean-Marie Daubenton
 1800 to 1802: Déodat Gratet de Dolomieu
 1802 to 1822: René Just Haüy
 1822 to 1847: Alexandre Brongniart
 1847 to 1857: Armand Dufrénoy
 1857 to 1876: Gabriel Delafosse
 1876 to 1892: Alfred Des Cloizeaux
 1893 to 1936: Alfred Lacroix
 1937 to 1967: Jean Orcel
 1968 to 1980: Jacques Fabriès
 1980 to 2001: not assigned
 Geology
 1793 to 1819: Barthélemy Faujas de Saint-Fond
 1819 to 1861: Louis Cordier
 1861 to 1891: Auguste Daubrée
 1892 to 1919: Stanislas-Étienne Meunier
 1920: unknown
 1921 to 1940: Paul Lemoine
 1941 to 1962: René Abrard
 1963 to 1980: Robert Laffitte
 1980 to 2001: Lucien Leclaire
Physics as Applied to the Natural Sciences
 1838 to 1877: Antoine-César Becquerel
 1878 to 1891: Edmond Becquerel
 1892 to 1908: Henri Becquerel
 1909 to 1948: Jean Becquerel
 1949 to 1977: Yves Le Grand. This chair was then combined with the chair of Physical-Chemistry of Biological Adaptation.
Natural Iconography or the Art of Drawing and Painting all the Things of Nature
 1793 to 1822 Gérard van Spaendonck. This chair is then removed.

References

 Jean Dorst (dir.), Muséum national d'histoire naturelle, 253 p., Fernand Nathan, Paris, 1980, 
 Yves Laissus, Le Muséum national d'histoire naturelle, Gallimard, Paris, 1995
 Stéphane Déligeorges, Alexandre Gady et Françoise Labalette, Le Jardin des Plantes et le Muséum national d'histoire naturelle, Monum, Paris, 2004, 64 p, 
 Annuaire et sites du Muséum national d'histoire naturelle, 40 p., MNHN, Paris, rééditions décennales.

Museum national d'histoire naturelle
Museums